Sowiński (Jewish, Masculine: Sowińsky) (feminine: Sowińska; plural: Sowińscy) is a Polish surname. It may refer to:

 Alexander Sowinski (born 1991), Canadian musician
 Anita Sowińska (born 1973), Polish economist and politician
 Arnold Sowinski (1931–2020), French footballer
 Erik Sowinski (born 1989), American middle-distance runner
 Ewa Sowińska (born 1944), Polish politician
 Ignacy Loga-Sowiński (1914–1992), Polish activist and politician
 Ignaz Sowinski (1858–1917), Galician architect
 Józef Sowiński (1777–1831), Polish general
 Judy Sowinski (1940–2011), American roller skater
 Marian Sowiński (born 1951), Polish general

See also
 

Polish-language surnames